Celtic Instrumentals is a collection of Rawlins Cross' favourite instrumental tracks from their previous CDs plus some newly recorded tunes. It was released in 1997 by Warner Music.

Track listing
"MacPherson's Lament"
"Little Sara"/"Jessie's Jig"
"O'Neil's March"/"The Haughs of Cromdale"
"Wedding Gift"
"Mac's Fancy"/"Give Me a Drink of Water"
"Israel Got a Rabbit"
"Memory Waltz"
"Back Down Home Medley"
"Rollicking Skipper B."/'The Shimmy"
"Little Beggarman"
"Mairi Nighean Alasdair"

1997 albums
Rawlins Cross albums